Mohammadhassan Senobar (born 11 July 1989 in Tehran) is an Iranian volleyball player who plays as a middle blocker for the Iranian national team. He made his debut for the national team in the game against Poland in the 2015 World League. Currently, he is the tallest player in the Iranian Super League.

Career

National team
Senobars's first national game was for Iran boys national volleyball team in 2012, he joined the Iran men's national volleyball team for 6 years.

Clubs in Iran
He started his career in his hometown volleyball club, he has also played for Bargh Tehran, Pas Tehran, Peykan Tehran, Aluminum Arak, ISI Iran, Barijessence, Shahrdari Tabriz, Khatam Ardakan

Personal life
Senobar was born in Tehran, Iran in a family with a history of involvement in volleyball.
He at school time activated in other sports like, Basketball and Handball.

Honours

National team
World Grand Champions Cup
Bronze medal (1): 2017
AVC cup
Gold medal (2): 2012, 2018
Asian Junior Volleyball cup
Gold medal (1): 2006
Islamic Games Champion
Gold medal (1): 2013
Iranian Super League

Club
Iranian Super League
Champions (4): 2018 (Khatam Ardakan), 2014 (Shahrdari Tabriz), 2009 (Tehran Champion), 2008 (Iran Champion)

Individual
Best Middle Blocker: Volleyball at the 2018 Iranian Volleyball Super League
Best Middle Blocker: Volleyball at the 2014 Iranian Volleyball Super League
Best Middle Blocker: Volleyball at the 2012 Iranian Volleyball Super League

References

1989 births
Living people
Iranian men's volleyball players
Islamic Solidarity Games competitors for Iran